Mittelbergheim is a commune in the Bas-Rhin department in Alsace in north-eastern France.

The village is a member of the Les Plus Beaux Villages de France ("The most beautiful villages of France") association.

Its  vineyards produce one of the finest Alsacian wines: the Grand Cru .

See also
 Communes of the Bas-Rhin department

References

External links

 Views of Mittelbergheim

Communes of Bas-Rhin
Bas-Rhin communes articles needing translation from French Wikipedia
Plus Beaux Villages de France